Anders Johansson may refer to:

Anders Johansson (drummer) (born 1962), Swedish musician, drummer of bands HammerFall and Yngwie Malmsteen's Rising Force
Anders Johansson (football manager) (born 1967), Swedish football manager
Anders Johansson (table tennis) (born 1955), Swedish table tennis player
Anders Johansson (comedian) (born 1972), Swedish comedian, television and radio presenter
Anders Johansson (singer), winner of series Fame Factory